Margaret of Burgundy may refer to:

  (1100–63), wife of Guigues IV of Albon
 Margaret of Burgundy, Queen of Sicily (1250–1308), daughter of Odo of Burgundy, wife of Charles I of Naples and Sicily
 Margaret of Burgundy, Queen of France (1290–1315), daughter of Robert II, Duke of Burgundy, wife of Louis X of France, mother of Joan II of Navarre
 Margaret I, Countess of Burgundy (1310–1382), niece of Margaret of Burgundy, Queen of France, daughter of Philip V of France and Joan II, Countess of Burgundy
 Margaret III, Countess of Flanders (1350–1405), granddaughter of Margaret I, Countess of Burgundy, wife of Philip the Bold, Duke of Burgundy
 Margaret of Bavaria (1363–1423), sister-in-law of Margaret of Burgundy, Duchess of Bavaria; wife of John II, Duke of Burgundy
 Margaret of Burgundy, Duchess of Bavaria (1374–1441), daughter of Margaret III, Countess of Flanders, countess of Holland and Hainaut, wife of William VI, Count of Holland
 Margaret of Burgundy, Dauphine of France (1393–1441), daughter of Margaret of Bavaria, wife of Louis, Dauphin of France & Arthur de Richemont, future Duke of Brittany
 Margaret of York (1446–1503), Duchess of Burgundy as third wife of Charles the Bold
 Archduchess Margaret of Austria, Duchess of Savoy (1480–1530), daughter of Mary, Duchess of Burgundy, and Maximilian I, Holy Roman Emperor
 Marguerite of Burgundy, Countess of Savoy (1192–1243), wife of Amadeus IV, Count of Savoy